SG Wallau-Massenheim  is a team handball club from Wallau (which belongs to Hofheim) east of Wiesbaden, Germany. Currently, the club competes in the 2. Bundesliga Süd

Accomplishments
Handball-Bundesliga:
1992, 1993
DHB-Pokal:
1993, 1994
DHB-Supercup:
1994
EHF Cup:
1992
EHF Champions League Finalists:
1993
 Double
 Winners (1): 1992–93

External links
 Club website

German handball clubs
Sport in Hesse